Bzhedugkhabl is a rural locality (an aul) in Sadovskoye Rural Settlement of Krasnogvardeysky District, Adygea, Russia. The population was 1041 as of 2018. There are 16 streets.

Geography 
Bzhedugkhabl is located 26 km southeast of Krasnogvardeyskoye (the district's administrative centre) by road. Sadovoye is the nearest rural locality.

Ethnicity 
The aul is inhabited by Kurds, Russians and Armenians according to the 2010 census.

References 

Rural localities in Krasnogvardeysky District
Kurdish settlements